The women's shot put at the 2018 World Para Athletics European Championships was held at the Friedrich-Ludwig-Jahn-Sportpark in Berlin from 20 to 26 August. 12 classification finals are held in all over this event.

Medalists

Results

F12

F20

F32

F33

F34

F35

F36/37

F40

F41

F54

F55

F57

See also
List of IPC world records in athletics

References

See also
List of IPC world records in athletics

shot put
2018 in women's athletics
Shot put at the World Para Athletics European Championships